Acidovorax soli is a gram-negative, catalase-negative, oxidase-negative non-motile, rod-shaped aerobic bacterium from the family Comamonadaceae which was isolated from landfill soil in Pohang in Korea. Colonies of Acidovorax soli are bright yellow colored.

References

External links
Type strain of Acidovorax soli at BacDive -  the Bacterial Diversity Metadatabase

Comamonadaceae
Bacteria described in 2010